Miguel Álvarez Jurado (born 22 March 1958) is a Spanish football manager, currently in charge of Villarreal CF B.

Managerial career
Born in Guarromán, Jaén, Andalusia, Álvarez made his managerial debuts with UDA Gramenet's youth setup in 1988. In 1991, he managed his first senior team, UE Cerdanyola de Mataró in the regional leagues.

In the 2000 summer Álvarez was appointed Terrassa FC manager, achieving a promotion to Segunda División in 2002. After avoiding relegation in the following year, he was sacked in September 2003.

In 2004 Álvarez was named Ciudad de Murcia manager. He was relieved from his duties on 20 December 2004 but returned to the club on 3 May of the following year, and narrowly avoided the drop.

In March 2006 Álvarez returned to Terrassa, now in Segunda División B, and subsequently stayed in the category, managing Lorca Deportiva CF, CF Badalona, CE L'Hospitalet (two stints) and CD Leganés. After missing out promotion in the play-offs with Hospi, he was appointed at the helm of second level's AD Alcorcón on 3 July 2013.

On 4 February 2014 Álvarez was sacked, mainly due to the club's poor home records in the campaign. On 18 February 2015, after one year without any club, he was named UE Sant Andreu manager.

On 12 June 2015 Álvarez was appointed CE Sabadell FC manager, signing a two-year deal. He signed for Marbella FC on 6 March 2017, replacing Mehdi Nafti, but was fired on 25 April. On 4 October, 2017 he was appointed Villarreal CF B head coach.

Managerial statistics

References

External links

1958 births
Living people
Sportspeople from the Province of Jaén (Spain)
Spanish football managers
Segunda División managers
Primera Federación managers
Segunda División B managers
Tercera División managers
Terrassa FC managers
Ciudad de Murcia managers
Lorca Deportiva CF managers
CF Badalona managers
CE L'Hospitalet managers
CD Leganés managers
AD Alcorcón managers
UE Sant Andreu managers
Cultural Leonesa managers
AD Ceuta managers
Cádiz CF managers
CE Sabadell FC managers
Villarreal CF B managers